Creekview High School can refer to:
Creekview High School (Canton, Georgia)
Creekview High School (Carrollton, Texas)